Corinth is an unincorporated community and coal town in Preston County, West Virginia, United States. Corinth was originally called Spencer but was changed in 1890 to avoid duplication of names in the state. It is named after the ancient Greek city of Corinth.

References

Unincorporated communities in Preston County, West Virginia
Unincorporated communities in West Virginia
Morgantown metropolitan area
Coal towns in West Virginia